Marcia Van Dresser (1877 – July 11, 1937) was an American operatic soprano, recitalist and actress. She was sometimes referred to as a mezzo-soprano.

Biography
She was born in 1877  and spent her early life in Memphis and later studied for opera with Hermine Bosetti and Jean de Reszke. She was a member of The Famous Original Bostonians before joining Alice Nielsen Company in 1898 for Victor Herbert's The Fortune Teller and Singing Girl. Studies voice with NYC’s Mrs. Sarah Robinson-Duff herself trained in Paris by Marchesi. Dresser appeared as an actress in 1902 with Otis Skinner in a revival of Francesca di Rimini. Apparently Van Dresser never recorded for the gramophone industry. Dresser joined NY's Metropolitan Opera Company, and sang across Europe before joining The Chicago Opera in 1915 for her major opera roles. 
In April 1918 she appeared at Aeolian Hall singing Haydn in Italian, Debussy and Fauré in French. The Haydn work had been arranged by the late Pauline Viardot.

She died in London on July 11, 1937 after a long illness.

References

External links

Early portrait(held by the Billy Rose Theatre Division, New York Public Library for the Performing Arts)
Portrait (Library of Congress)
In patriotic American Flag attire during World War One
Portrait from the early 1900s (Univ. of Florida,George A. Smather Libraries)
Portrait (University of Louisville, Macauley collection)
 Alice Nielsen and the Gayety of Nations by Dall Wilson (2012-2017)

1877 births
1937 deaths
Actresses from Memphis, Tennessee
American stage actresses
American operatic sopranos
19th-century American women opera singers
20th-century American actresses
20th-century American women opera singers
Musicians from Memphis, Tennessee
Singers from Tennessee
Classical musicians from Tennessee